Punta de Rieles – Bella Italia is a barrio (neighbourhood or district) of Montevideo, Uruguay.

Places of worship 
 Parish Church of St John Bosco, Camino Maldonado Km 16 Nº 7777 (Roman Catholic, Salesians of Don Bosco)

See also 
Barrios of Montevideo

External links 
Article del diari La República about Punta de Rieles (Spanish)
Revista Raíces/Historia del barrio Punta de Rieles (Spanish)

Barrios of Montevideo
Italian immigration to Uruguay
Italian-Uruguayan culture